Douglas Eaglesham Dunn, OBE (born 23 October 1942) is a Scottish poet, academic, and critic. He is Professor of English and Director of St Andrew's Scottish Studies Institute at St Andrew's University.

Background
Dunn was born in Inchinnan, Renfrewshire. He was educated at the Scottish School of Librarianship, and worked as a librarian before he started his studies in Hull. After graduating with a First Class Honours degree from the University of Hull, he worked in the university's Brynmor Jones Library under Philip Larkin. He was friendly with Larkin and admired his poetry, but did not share his political opinions.

He was a Professor of English at the University of St Andrews from 1991, becoming Director of the University's Scottish Studies Centre in 1993 until his retirement in September 2008. He is now an Honorary Professor at St Andrews, still undertaking postgraduate supervision in the School of English. He was a member of the Scottish Arts Council (1992–1994). He holds an honorary doctorate (LL.D., law) from the University of Dundee, an honorary doctorate (D.Litt., literature) from the University of Hull and St Andrews. He became a Fellow of the Royal Society of Literature in 1981, and was appointed an Officer of the Order of the British Empire in 2003. Terry Street, Dunn's first collection of poems, appeared in 1969 and received a Scottish Arts Council Book Award as well as a Somerset Maugham Award.

Awards and honours
1968 Eric Gregory Award
1969 Scottish Arts Council Book Award for Terry Street
1969 Somerset Maugham Award.  for Terry Street
1976 Scottish Arts Council Book Award for Love or Nothing
1976 Geoffrey Faber Memorial Prize for Love or Nothing
1981 Hawthornden Prize for St. Kilda's Parliament
1981 Fellow of the Royal Society of Literature
1985 Whitbread Book of the Year for Elegies
1989 Cholmondeley Award 
2003 Officer of the OBE
Guggenheim Fellowship 
Honorary doctorate (LL.D., law) from the University of Dundee
Honorary doctorate (D.Litt., literature) from the University of Hull
Honorary doctorate (D.Litt., literature) from the University of St Andrews

Selected works
Terry Street - 1969 (winner of the Somerset Maugham Award)
The Happier Life - 1972
Love or Nothing - 1974 (winner of the Geoffrey Faber Memorial Prize)
Barbarians - 1979
St. Kilda's Parliament - 1981 (winner of the Hawthornden Prize)
Europa's Lover - 1982
Elegies - 1985
Secret Villages (collection of short stories) - 1985
Northlight - 1988
Andromache (translation of Racine's play of the same name) - 1990
Dante's Drum-Kit - 1993
Boyfriends and Girlfriends - 1995
The Donkey's Ear - 2000
The Year's Afternoon - 2000
New Selected Poems 1964-2000 - 2002
The Noise of a Fly - 2017

Reviews
 White, Kenneth (1982), review of St. Kilda's Parliament, in Murray, Glen (ed.), Cencrastus No. 8, Spring 1982, pp.44 & 45, 
 Craig, Cairns (1984), Lourd on My Hert, which includes a review of Europa's Lover, in Hearn, Sheila G. (ed.), Cencrastus No. 15, New Year 1984, pp. 54 & 55,

Notes

References

External links
 Art UK Your Paintings, in partnership with the Public Catalogue Foundation 
 
 Profile and poems written and audio at The Poetry Archive 
 Guardian profile "Speaking from experience" 18 January 2003 
 Article "Douglas Dunn: Finished Fragrance: The Poems of George Mackay Brown.  Poetry Nation No 2 - 1974
 National Gallery of Scotland profile and sculpture
Ferens Gallery, Hull.

People from Renfrewshire
Scottish librarians
Scottish literary critics
Scottish poets
Officers of the Order of the British Empire
Fellows of the Royal Society of Literature
Academics of the University of St Andrews
Scottish scholars and academics
Alumni of the University of Hull
1942 births
Living people
Scottish academics of English literature